C-1027 or Lidamycin is an antitumor antibiotic consisting of a complex of an enediyne chromophore and an apoprotein.
 It shows antibiotic activity against most Gram-positive bacteria. It is one of the most potent cytotoxic molecules known, due to its induction of a higher ratio of DNA double-strand breaks than single-strand breaks.

C-1027's chromophore contains a nine-membered enediyne that is responsible for most of the molecule's biological activity. Unlike other enediynes, this molecule contains no triggering mechanism. It is already primed to undergo the cycloaromatization reaction without external activation to produce the toxic 1,4-benzenoid diradical species. C-1027 can induce oxygen-independent interstrand DNA crosslinks in addition to the oxygen-dependent single- and double-stranded DNA breaks typically generated by other enediynes. This unique oxygen-independent mechanism suggests that C-1027 may be effective against hypoxic tumor cells.

C-1027 shows promise as an anticancer drug and is currently undergoing phase II clinical trials in China, with a 30% success rate. It can induce apoptosis in many cancer cells and recent studies have indicated that it induces unusual DNA damage responses to double-strand breaks, including altering cell cycle progression and inducing chromosomal aberrations.

References 

Antibiotics
Experimental cancer drugs
Enediynes
Nine-membered rings
Vinylidene compounds